Football at the 2011 Summer Universiade will be held at six venues in Shenzhen, China from 11 August to 22 August.

Medal summary

Medal table

Events

References

 
2011
2011 in association football
football
2011
2011 in Chinese football